Stygobromus cooperi, commonly called Cooper's cave amphipod, is a troglomorphic species of amphipod in family Crangonyctidae. It is endemic to a single cave, Silers cave in Berkeley County, West Virginia in the United States.

References

Freshwater crustaceans of North America
Crustaceans described in 1967
Cave crustaceans
cooperi
Endemic fauna of West Virginia